Cocktail is a 1988 American romantic comedy-drama film directed by Roger Donaldson from a screenplay by Heywood Gould, based on Gould's book of the same name. The film tells the story of a young New York City business student, Brian Flanagan, who takes up bartending in order to make ends meet. The film stars Tom Cruise, Bryan Brown, and Elisabeth Shue.

Released on July 29, 1988, by Buena Vista Pictures (under its adult film label Touchstone Pictures), Cocktail features an original music score composed by J. Peter Robinson. Despite earning overwhelmingly negative reviews from critics, and winning the Golden Raspberry Award for Worst Picture, the film was a huge box office success, grossing more than $170 million worldwide against a budget of $20 million.

Plot

Cocky Brian Flanagan, just finished with his stint in the army, heads back to NYC and is eager to land a high-powered job in the business world. When he fails, he settles for work as a bartender while attending business school during the day. 

Doug Coughlin, an older and experienced bartender, takes Brian under his wing and teaches him how to flair. They become friends, with Doug giving Brian the idea for a nationwide chain of bars called Cocktails and Dreams. Brian drops out of business school and they become popular bartenders at a trendy nightclub. 

Eventually, their flairing act catches the eye of Coral, a wealthy photographer and she and Brian begin dating. Doug bets Brian that the relationship won't last and, unbeknownst to Brian, tricks Coral into sleeping with him. After Coral breaks up with Brian, he has a nasty fight with Doug in front of a full bar and dissolves their partnership.

Two years later, Brian is working at a beachside bar in Jamaica, hoping to save enough money for his own bar. He meets beautiful artist Jordan Mooney and they begin a passionate relationship. Out of the blue, Doug shows up, now married to the wealthy, flirtatious and much younger Kerry, and bets Brian that he can't attract Bonnie, a wealthy older woman. Brian accepts his challenge and wins Bonnie over. Jordan is devastated when she spots Brian and Bonnie drunkenly walking to Bonnie's hotel room. The next morning, Brian regrets the fling and seeks out Jordan, only to find she has left for the United States.
  
Brian returns to New York with Bonnie, hoping she will get him the corporate job he wants, but soon feels marginalized and resents her lifestyle. While attending an art exhibit, Brian has an altercation with the artist in front of Bonnie's friends, leading them to break up. 

Brian tries to reconcile with Jordan, but she angrily refuses. When calmer, she reveals she is pregnant with his child and does not want him in her life because she does not want to be hurt again. After he tries again to talk to Jordan, a neighbor tells him she has moved into her parents’ upscale Park Avenue apartment. Jordan's father, Richard, tries to pay Brian off, but he refuses. Jordan explains that she hid her wealth because she wanted him to love her for who she was. To illustrate how little he cares about her money, he tears up her father's check and leaves.

Brian finds Doug on his new yacht and thinks he has finally achieved the financial success they both wanted. However, Doug tells him that when his business began to fail, he invested all of Kerry's money in commodities and lost her entire wealth.  

When Brian takes Kerry to her apartment, she says she is bored with marriage and tries to seduce him, but he rebuffs her. He goes back to Doug's boat and finds him dead from suicide. Kerry mails a letter to Brian that was left for him by Doug, which turns out to be Doug's suicide note, explaining that his life was a fraud.

Distraught, but determined to win Jordan over, Brian tries to visit her, but is stopped by security who has been told by Jordan's father not to admit him. He fights his way up to the apartment, tells her of Doug's death and says he doesn't want to make the same mistake by being too proud to ask for help. He says his Uncle Pat has given him a loan to start his own bar and confidently predicts that he will be successful. 

When Jordan still hesitates, Brian declares his love for her, that he wants to marry her and take care of her and their child. She agrees to take him back, but Richard interferes, leading to a fight where a security guard assaults Jordan. As they leave, Richard tells them they are on their own and Brian answers that he prefers it that way.

Brian and Jordan marry and he finally lives out his dream, opening his own bar, Flanagan's Cocktails and Dreams, with hopes of starting franchises across the country. At the grand opening, Jordan whispers that she is pregnant with twins. In his happiness and much to his Uncle's chagrin, he proclaims that drinks are “on the house” and the bar is open.

Cast

Production

Script
The film was based on Heywood Gould's semi-autobiographical novel published in 1984. Gould had worked as a bartender in New York from 1969 to 1981 to support his writing career. Gould said he "met a lot of interesting people behind the bar and very rarely was it someone who started out wanting to be a bartender. They all had ambitions, some smoldering and some completely forgotten or suppressed."

Gould says the lead character "is a composite of a lot of people I met, including myself in those days. I was in my late 30s, and I was drinking pretty good, and I was starting to feel like I was missing the boat. The character in the book is an older guy who has been around and starting to feel that he's pretty washed-up."

Universal bought the film rights and Gould wrote the script, changing it from his novel. He says the studio put the project in turnaround "because I wasn't making the character likable enough." Disney picked up the project "and I went through the same process with them. I would fight them at every turn, and there was a huge battle over making the lead younger, which I eventually did."

Gould later admitted that the people who wanted him to make changes "were correct. They wanted movie characters. Characters who were upbeat and who were going to have a happy ending and a possible future in their lives. That's what you want for a big commercial Hollywood movie. So I tried to walk that thin line between giving them what they wanted and not completely betraying the whole arena of saloons in general."

Tom Cruise expressed interest in playing the role, which helped get it financed.

"There were a lot of bartenders around like Tom Cruise, younger guys who came on and were doing this for a while—and then 10 years later, still doing it," said Gould. "It wasn't as if I was betraying the character. It was a matter of making the character more idealistic, more hopeful—he's got his life ahead of him. He turns on the charm, without the cynical bitter edge of the older guys."

Bryan Brown later said the original script "was one of the very best screenplays I had ever read. Very dark... about the cult of celebrity and everything about it.... Tom Cruise is a very sweet man, he was then and still is. But when Tom came in, the movie had to change. The studio made the changes to protect the star and it became a much slighter movie because of it."

Casting
Bryan Brown was cast on the strength of his performance in F/X.

Production
Gould says the tricks involving throwing bottles was not in the book, but something he showed Cruise and Bryan Brown. They used it and it became a prominent feature of the film.

Post production
A music score was originally done by Maurice Jarre. A new score was added at the last minute.

Kelly Lynch later said the film "was actually a really complicated story about the '80s and power and money, and it was really re-edited where they completely lost my character's backstory—her low self-esteem, who her father was, why she was this person that she was—but it was obviously a really successful movie, if not as good as it could've been." She claimed Disney reshot "about a third of the film... and turned it into flipping the bottles and this and that.... But we had a really great time. And Tom was so much fun, just a ball to work with, both on and off camera."

Reception

Box office
Cocktail earned $78.2 million at the North American box office, and $93.3 million international to a total of $171.5 million worldwide, almost nine times its $20 million budget, and ranking as the eighth highest-grossing film of 1988 worldwide.

Critical response
Despite its box office success, Cocktail received overwhelmingly negative reviews from critics. Review aggregator Rotten Tomatoes reports that 9% of 45 film critics have given the film a positive review, with a rating average of 4.2/10. The website's critical consensus reads, "There are no surprises in Cocktail, a shallow, dramatically inert romance that squanders Tom Cruise's talents in what amounts to a naive barkeep's banal fantasy." On Metacritic, the film has a 12 out of 100 score based on 14 reviews, indicating "overwhelming dislike". Audiences polled by CinemaScore gave the film an average grade of "B+" on an A+ to F scale.

Vincent Canby of The New York Times gave a negative review, calling it "an upscale, utterly brainless variation on those efficient old B-movies of the 1930s and 40s about the lives, loves and skills of coal miners, sand hogs, and telephone linemen, among others." Roger Ebert of the Chicago Sun-Times was also critical, explaining that "the more you think about what really happens in Cocktail, the more you realize how empty and fabricated it really is."

"I was not happy with the final product," said Gould. "It got so savaged by the critics ... I was accused of betraying my own work, which is stupid. So I was pretty devastated. I literally couldn't get out of bed for a day. The good thing about that experience is that it toughened me up."

In 1992, Cruise said the film "was not a crowning jewel" in his career.

The official soundtrack single, The Beach Boys' "Kokomo", was commercially successful and topped the charts in America, Australia and Japan. The song was nominated for a Grammy and a Golden Globe.

Accolades
Cocktail won two Golden Raspberry Awards for Worst Picture and Worst Screenplay while Cruise was nominated as Worst Actor and Donaldson as Worst Director. The film is listed in Golden Raspberry Award founder John Wilson's book The Official Razzie Movie Guide as one of "The 100 Most Enjoyably Bad Movies Ever Made". The film was also nominated for Worst Picture at the 1988 Stinkers Bad Movie Awards but lost to Caddyshack II.

Additionally, Cruise's other film in 1988 was his co-starring role in the Best Picture-winning film Rain Man, alongside Dustin Hoffman. In doing so, he became the first (and as of 2023, only) actor to star in a Worst Picture Razzie winner and Best Picture Oscar winner in the same year.

Soundtrack

Additional tracks featured in the film include:
 "Addicted to Love" – Robert Palmer
 "Shelter of Your Love" – Jimmy Cliff
 "This Magic Moment" – Leroy Gibbons
 "When Will I Be Loved" – The Everly Brothers (uncredited)
 "That Hypnotizin' Boogie" - David Wilcox

Charts

Certifications

References

External links

 
 
 
 

1988 films
1988 comedy-drama films
1988 romantic comedy films
1988 romantic drama films
1980s English-language films
1980s romantic comedy-drama films
American buddy comedy-drama films
American pregnancy films
American romantic comedy-drama films
Elektra Records soundtracks
Films about bartenders
Films about suicide
Films about social class
Films directed by Roger Donaldson
Films scored by J. Peter Robinson
Films set in Jamaica
Films set in New York City
Films set in restaurants
Golden Raspberry Award winning films
Interscope Communications films
Touchstone Pictures films
1980s American films